Leo Kersley (30 May 1920 – 3 July 2012) was a British dancer and teacher. Kersley was a founding member of the Sadler's Wells Theatre Ballet and was influential in classical ballet in the Netherlands.

References

1920 births
2012 deaths
Ballet teachers
British male ballet dancers
British expatriates in the Netherlands